Ectoedemia empetrifolii  is a moth of the family Nepticulidae. It is found in Greece (Peloponnesus).

The larvae feed on Hypericum empetrifolium. They mine the leaves of their host plant. The mine consists of a narrow corridor, generally along the leaf margin, widening into a blotch that occupies almost the complete leaf. The frass is concentrated in the basal part of the blotch.

External links
Fauna Europaea
bladmineerders.nl

Nepticulidae
Moths of Europe
Moths described in 2000